Guaso Village is a village in the Aínsa-Sobrarbe municipality, Aragon, Spain.

It is a small hilltop village in the Pyrenees. The village has a tower which forms a prominent landmark, visible from the nearby ancient town of Ainsa. The hilltop provides panoramic views of the area which features many famous geological features such as the Boltana anticline to the west, the Penya Montanyesa mountain to the north and the town of Ainsa to the east.

Gallery

External links 

 Aínsa Town Hall 
 Villa de Aínsa

Aínsa-Sobrarbe